The 2016–17 Croatian Second Football League (officially FavBet Druga liga for sponsorship reasons) is the 26th season of the Croatian Second Football League, the second level football competition for men's association football teams in Croatia, since its establishment in 1992. The season started on 19 August 2016 and ended on 28 May 2017.

The league is contested by twelve teams and played in a triple round robin format, with each team playing every other team three times over 33 rounds. At the end of the previous season Cibalia were promoted, returning to the top flight after three seasons.

The fixtures were announced on 17 July 2016.

Teams
On 22 April 2016, Croatian Football Federation announced that the first stage of licensing procedure for 2016–17 season was completed. For the 2016–17 Druga HNL, only eight clubs outside of top level were issued a second level license: Dugopolje, Dinamo II, Gorica, Imotski, Lučko, Rijeka II, Sesvete and Solin. In the second stage of licensing procedure clubs that were not licensed in the first round appealed the decision. On 23 May 2016, all remaining Druga HNL were granted second division license, along with third level clubs Novigrad and Vinogradar.

Stadia and locations

Number of teams by county

League table

Results

Matches 1–22

Matches 23-33

Top scorers

See also
2016–17 Croatian Football Cup
2016–17 Croatian First Football League

References

External links
Official website  

2016-17
Cro
2